The Debra K. Johnson Rehabilitation Center, formerly the Tennessee Prison for Women, is a Tennessee Department of Correction prison for women located in Nashville, Tennessee.

DJRC, the state's primary women's correctional facility, houses women of all custody levels. The prison serves as the state's new female prisoner intake and classification center, and it also houses all female death row inmates.  There is currently only one female on death row in the state of Tennessee, Christa Pike. Women on death row are not housed in special death row units because few women go on death row. The prison first opened in 1966 and has a capacity of 760 inmates. The state classifies the prison as a maximum security institution.

Notable inmates
Vanessa Coleman — Convicted of the facilitation of aggravated kidnapping, facilitation of rape, and the facilitation of the murder of Channon Christian.
Christa Pike — is the youngest woman to be sentenced to death in the United States during the post-Furman period. She was 20 when convicted of the torture murder of a classmate she committed at age 18.
Natasha Cornett — is an American criminal currently serving a sentence of life without parole at the Tennessee Prison for Women in Nashville for her involvement in the Lillelid murders.
Jennifer Hyatte — a former prison nurse who fatally shot a corrections officer while trying to break her husband, George Hyatte out of custody. Less than 36 hours after their escape, they are arrested and then charged with first degree murder. Both were convicted and sentenced to life in prison with no possibility of parole.
Pamela Rogers Turner — Teacher and child rapist.

Former Inmates
Cyntoia Brown — a juvenile forced into prostitution, she murdered Johnny Michael Allen when she was 16 and was initially to have served a minimum of 51 years, but received clemency after a public campaign. Released August 7, 2019.

References

External links

 "Tennessee Prison for Women." Tennessee Department of Correction

Prisons in Tennessee
Buildings and structures in Nashville, Tennessee
Women's prisons in the United States
1966 establishments in Tennessee
Women in Tennessee